Rosebank (or the Rosebank Peninsula) is a peninsula and industrial suburb of Auckland, New Zealand. It is the westernmost point of the Auckland isthmus. The peninsula runs from the southeast in a northerly direction, with the Whau River on its west. Pollen Island and Traherne Island lie nearby in the Waitematā Harbour to the north-eastern side of the peninsula. Traherne Island is connected to the peninsula by a causeway that is part of the Northwestern Motorway.

The Northwestern Motorway cuts across the top of the peninsula, with flyover ramps connecting at Rosebank Road and Patiki Road. The Northwestern Cycleway also runs across it, parallel to the motorway.

The suburb is a large employment area mainly composed of industrial (manufacturing, with some office) properties off Rosebank Road (with 813 businesses operating here in 2009). There is one "open space" area, the Rosebank Park Domain in the northwest of the peninsula, almost solely used for go-karting and as a speedway (leased from Council).

The Motu Manawa (Pollen Island) Marine Reserve covers all of the harbour adjacent to the north and east of the peninsula, including Pollen and Traherne Islands.

History

A number of archeological remains exist along the northern part of the peninsula, including old Maori middens, a tramway and remnants of a limeworks and early housing sites. However, most of these have been destroyed by development and past motorway construction.

In 1852, Dr. Daniel Pollen opened the first brickworks in West Auckland, at Rosebank on the shores of the Whau River. Pollen engaged with British potter James Wright to create the first commercial scale crockery kiln in New Zealand at the location. Shells taken from the banks of Motumānawa / Pollen Island were processed at the brickworks, in order to create lime for the brick and concrete industries.

Demographics

Rosebank Peninsula had a population of 30 at the 2018 New Zealand census, an increase of 15 people (100.0%) since the 2013 census, and unchanged since the 2006 census. There were 3 households, comprising 21 males and 3 females, giving a sex ratio of 7.0 males per female. The median age was 42.1 years (compared with 37.4 years nationally), with 3 people (10.0%) aged under 15 years, 6 (20.0%) aged 15 to 29, 15 (50.0%) aged 30 to 64, and 3 (10.0%) aged 65 or older.

Ethnicities were 60.0% European/Pākehā, 30.0% Asian, and 10.0% other ethnicities. People may identify with more than one ethnicity.

The percentage of people born overseas was 30.0, compared with 27.1% nationally.

Although some people chose not to answer the census's question about religious affiliation, 50.0% had no religion, 40.0% were Christian, and 20.0% were Hindu.

Of those at least 15 years old, 3 (11.1%) people had a bachelor's or higher degree, and 3 (11.1%) people had no formal qualifications. The median income was $53,900, compared with $31,800 nationally. 9 people (33.3%) earned over $70,000 compared to 17.2% nationally. The employment status of those at least 15 was that 21 (77.8%) people were employed full-time, and 3 (11.1%) were part-time.

Panorama

References 

Suburbs of Auckland
Populated places around the Waitematā Harbour
Whau Local Board Area
West Auckland, New Zealand